1UP is the sixth studio album by American rapper T-Pain, released on February 27, 2019. It is the follow-up to his 2017 album Oblivion. It was a surprise release, as T-Pain had not announced a release date prior; its release date coincided with the season finale of The Masked Singer, where T-Pain was revealed as the champion. 1UP was preceded by the release of the singles "Getcha Roll On", "All I Want" and "A Million Times" and features appearances from Lil Wayne, Boosie Badazz, O.T. Genasis, Russ, Profit Dinero, Tory Lanez and Flipp Dinero.

Background and composition
T-Pain named the album after a term for an extra life in video games, saying on Beats 1: "I'm an avid gamer. I've been a gamer pretty much all my life. So I'm starting to implement gaming into my music and to my themes and stuff like that." Spin said the album features T-Pain's "customarily lascivious crooning and rapping across 12 tracks." The cover art for the album was created by Canadian artist Pencil Fingerz.

Track listing

Charts

References

2019 albums
T-Pain albums
Nappy Boy Entertainment albums